Scottish Politician of the Year is an annual award established in 1999. It is held by The Herald newspaper in Prestonfield House, Edinburgh.

Although the awards ceremony has been held once at the Royal Museum, Prestonfield House Hotel is considered to be the home of the event. At the 2004 ceremony – held at the Prestonfield –  former Labour MSP and life peer Mike Watson, set fire to a curtain, and was subsequently convicted of wilful fire raising.

Not all of the subsidiary awards are handed out every year.

Winners

Main award: Scottish Politician of the Year
2022: Anas Sarwar MSP, Labour
2021: no award
2020: no award
2019: Nicola Sturgeon MSP, Scottish National Party, First Minister
2018: Jeane Freeman MSP, Scottish National Party, Cabinet Secretary for Health and Sport
2017: Ruth Davidson MSP, Scottish Conservative and Unionist party
2016: Ruth Davidson MSP, Scottish Conservative and Unionist party
2015: Nicola Sturgeon MSP, Scottish National Party, First Minister
2014: Nicola Sturgeon MSP, Scottish National Party, First Minister
2013: Alex Salmond MSP, Scottish National Party, First Minister
2012: Nicola Sturgeon MSP, Scottish National Party, Deputy First Minister
2011: Alex Salmond MSP, Scottish National Party, First Minister
2010: Hugh Henry MSP, Labour, back-bencher, convenor of Public Audit Committee
2009: John Swinney MSP, Scottish National Party, Cabinet Secretary for Finance and Sustainable Growth
2008: Nicola Sturgeon MSP, Scottish National Party, Deputy First Minister
2007: Alex Salmond MSP MP, Scottish National Party, First Minister
2006: Andy Kerr MSP, Labour, Minister for Health and Community Care
2005: George Reid MSP, Scottish National Party, Presiding Officer of the Scottish Parliament
2004: Margaret Curran MSP, Labour, Minister for Communities
2003: George Reid MSP, Scottish National Party, Presiding Officer of the Scottish Parliament
2002: Malcolm Chisholm MSP, Labour, Minister for Health and Community Care
2001: Jack McConnell MSP, Labour, First Minister
2000: Jim Wallace MSP MP, Liberal Democrats, Deputy First Minister
1999: Donald Dewar MSP, MP, Labour, First Minister

Best Scot at Westminster
2022: Stewart McDonald MP, Scottish National Party
2021: no award
2020: no award
2019: Joanna Cherry MP, Scottish National Party
2018: Paul Sweeney MP, Labour and Co-operative, Shadow Under-Secretary of State for Scotland
2017: Alison Thewliss MP, Scottish National Party
2016: David Mundell MP, Conservative and Unionist, Secretary of State for Scotland
2015: Angus Robertson MP, Scottish National Party Parliamentary Group Leader in Westminster
2014: Gordon Brown MP, Labour
2013: Douglas Alexander MP, Labour
2012: Michael Moore MP, Liberal Democrats, Secretary of State for Scotland
2011: Angus Robertson MP, Scottish National Party Parliamentary Group Leader in Westminster and shadow minister for Defence and Foreign Affairs
2010: Jim Murphy MP, Labour, Shadow Secretary of State for Defence
2009: Jim Murphy MP, Labour, Secretary of State for Scotland
2008: Alistair Darling MP, Labour, Chancellor of the Exchequer
2007: Gordon Brown MP, Labour, Prime Minister
2006: Angus MacNeil MP, Scottish National Party, for instigating the Metropolitan Police investigation into the Cash for Honours scandal 
2005: Des Browne MP, Labour, Chief Secretary to the Treasury
2004: Menzies Campbell MP, Deputy Leader of the Liberal Democrats and Lib Dem Foreign Affairs Spokesman
2003: Robin Cook MP, Labour, President of the Party of European Socialists; backbencher after his resignation as Lord President of the Council and Leader of the House of Commons on 17 March 2003 in protest against the invasion of Iraq 
2002: Alistair Darling MP, Labour, Secretary of State for Transport
2001: John Reid MP, Labour, Secretary of State for Northern Ireland
2000: Gordon Brown MP, Labour, Chancellor of the Exchequer
1999: Gordon Brown MP, Labour, Chancellor of the Exchequer

Debater of the Year, since 2001 renamed Donald Dewar Debater of the Year
2022: Anas Sarwar MSP, Labour
2021: no award
2020: no award
2018: Michael Russell MSP, Scottish National Party
2017: Kezia Dugdale MSP, Labour
2016: Ruth Davidson MSP, Conservative and Unionist
2015: Willie Rennie MSP, Liberal Democrats
2014: Ruth Davidson MSP, Conservative and Unionist
2013: Johann Lamont MSP, Labour
2012: Dennis Robertson MSP, Scottish National Party
2011: Nicola Sturgeon MSP, Scottish National Party
2010: Derek Brownlee MSP, Conservative and Unionist
2009: John Swinney MSP, Scottish National Party
2008: Nicola Sturgeon MSP, Scottish National Party
2007: John Swinney MSP, Scottish National Party
2006: Tavish Scott MSP, Liberal Democrats
2005: Alex Neil MSP, Scottish National Party
2004: Nicola Sturgeon MSP, Scottish National Party
2003: David McLetchie MSP, Conservative and Unionist
2002: David McLetchie MSP, Conservative and Unionist
2001: Tommy Sheridan MSP, Scottish Socialist Party
2000: Michael Russell MSP, Scottish National Party
1999: Frank McAveety MSP, Labour

The Herald Politics in Business Award
2022: Ivan McKee MSP, Scottish National Party
2021: no award
2020: no award
2018: Murdo Fraser MSP, Conservative and Unionist
2017: Murdo Fraser MSP, Conservative and Unionist
2016: Fergus Ewing MSP, Scottish National Party
2015: Gavin Brown MSP, Conservative and Unionist
2014: Fergus Ewing MSP, Scottish National Party
2013: Richard Lochhead MSP, Scottish National Party, Cabinet Secretary for Rural Affairs and the Environment

Public Campaign/Campaigner of the Year
2022: Back Off Scotland and Gillian Mackay MSP, Scottish Green Party
2021: no award
2020: no award
2018: Gillian Murray
2017: Amanda Kopel, Frank's Law
2016: NO2NP
2015: Gordon Aikman – Gordon's Fightback
2014: Coalition for Continuing Care – Barnardo's Scotland, Aberlour Childcare Trust and WhoCares? Scotland 
2012: Shelter Scotland
2012: Martha Payne, blogger and campaigner
2011 - 2 awards: RAF Lossiemouth and Frank Maguire, lawyer and campaigner (posthumous award)
2010: Ann Moulds, anti-stalking
2008: Clydeside Action on Asbestos
2007: Farepak savers' campaign
2006: Campaign to block the deportation of Sakchai Makao to Thailand 
2005: Glasgow Girls, a group of young women who highlighted the situation of asylum seekers
2004: Özlem and David Grimason, the parents of a baby - Alistair Grimason - killed by gunfire in Turkey: campaigned for a change in Turkish gun laws
2003: Margo MacDonald MSP, Independent
2002: Margo MacDonald MSP, Scottish National Party
2001: no award
2000: no award
1999: no award

Councillor/Local Government Politician of the Year
2022: Stephen McCabe, Labour, Leader of Inverclyde Council
2021: no award
2020: no award
2018: John Alexander, Scottish National Party, Leader of Dundee City Council
2017: Jenny Laing, Labour, co-leader of Aberdeen City Council
2016: Mark Macmillan, Labour, Leader of Renfrewshire Council
2015: David Parker, Scottish Borders Council
2014: Gordon Matheson, Labour, Leader of Glasgow City Council
2013: The three leaders of the Island councils:
Steven Heddle, Independent, Orkney Islands Council
Gary Robinson, Independent, Shetland Islands Council
Councillor Angus Campbell, Independent, Comhairle nan Eilean Siar (Outer Hebrides)
2012: Gordon Matheson, Labour, Glasgow City Council
2011: Michael Foxley, Liberal Democrats, Highland Council
2010: Pat Watters, Labour, Convention of Scottish Local Authorities
2009: Steven Purcell, Labour, Glasgow City Council

e-Politician of the Year
2022: Sandesh Gulhane MSP, Conservative and Unionist
2021: no award
2020: no award
2019: Murdo Fraser MSP, Conservative and Unionist
2018: Nicola Sturgeon MSP, Scottish National Party, First Minister
2017: Ruth Davidson MSP, Conservative and Unionist
2016: Johann Lamont MSP, Labour
2015: Ruth Davidson MSP, Conservative and Unionist
2014: Nicola Sturgeon MSP, Scottish National Party, First Minister
2013: Patrick Harvie, MSP, Scottish Green Party

Lifetime Achievement Award/Outstanding Political Achievement
2022: Elish Angiolini
2021: no award
2020: no award
2018: no award
2017: no award
2016: Menzies Campbell, Liberal Democrats
2015: no award
2014: Alistair Darling MP, Labour
2013: Rt Hon Sir George Reid, former Presiding Officer
2012: no award
2011 - 2 awards: Gordon Brown MP, Labour; and Joe Quinn, former Scottish Political Editor of the Press Association
2010: Jack McConnell MSP, Labour, First Minister 2001 - 2007
2008: Jim Wallace, former leader of the Scottish Liberal Democrats
2007: Margo MacDonald MSP, Independent
2006: no award
2005: Robin Cook MP, Labour (posthumous award)
2004: Tam Dalyell MP, Labour
2002: Winnie Ewing MSP, Scottish National Party
2001: David Steel MSP, Liberal Democrats
2000: Alex Salmond MSP MP, Scottish National Party
1999: no award

Committee/Committee Member(s) of the Year
2022: Richard Leonard MSP, Labour
2021: no award
2020: no award
2018: Bruce Crawford MSP, Scottish National Party, Finance and Constitution Committee
2017: Alex Neil MSP, Scottish National Party
2016: Mary Scanlon MSP, Conservative and Unionist
2015: Alison McInnes MSP, Liberal Democrats
2014: Hugh Henry MSP, Labour
2012: no award
2011: no award
2010: Public Accounts Committee
2009: Public Accounts Committee
2008: Bill Aitken MSP, Conservative and Unionist, for convenership of the Justice Committee
2007: no award
2006: Justice 1 Committee
2005: Finance Committee
2004: Des McNulty MSP, Labour
2003: John McAllion MSP and Michael McMahon MSP, both Labour, Petitions Committee
2002: Mike Rumbles MSP, Liberal Democrats
2001: John McAllion MSP, Labour
2000: Gordon Jackson MSP, Labour
1999: no award

Community MSP of the Year
2022: Paul Sweeney MSP, Labour and Co-operative
2021: no award
2020: no award
2018: Anas Sarwar MSP, Labour
2017: Andy Wightman MSP, Green Party
2016: Jackie Baillie MSP, Labour
2015: Neil Findlay MSP, Labour
2014: John Finnie MSP, Independent

Judges Award (2014 only)
 Gordon Aikman

One to Watch/Award for Progress (1999-2013 only)

2022: Neil Gray MSP, Scottish National Party
2021: no award
2020: no award
2018: Kate Forbes MSP, Scottish National Party
2017: Monica Lennon MSP, Labour
2016: Alex Cole-Hamilton MSP, Liberal Democrats
2015: no award
2014: no award
2013: Kezia Dugdale MSP, Labour
2012: Humza Yousaf MSP, Scottish National Party
2011: no award
2010: Shirley-Anne Somerville MSP, Scottish National Party
2009: Gavin Brown MSP, Conservative and Unionist
2008: John Park MSP, Labour
2007: Derek Brownlee MSP, Conservative and Unionist
2006: Parliamentary group of 7 Scottish Green Party MSPs
2005: Wendy Alexander MSP, Labour
2004: Patrick Harvie MSP, Green
2003: Rosie Kane MSP, Scottish Socialist Party
2002: no award
2001: Christine Grahame MSP, Scottish National Party
2000: Tavish Scott MSP, Liberal Democrats
1999: Tricia Marwick MSP, Scottish National Party

Political Impact of the Year (2011-2013 only)
2013: Kenny MacAskill MSP, Scottish National Party, Cabinet Secretary for Justice
2012: Johann Lamont MSP, Labour
2011: Murdo Fraser MSP, Conservative and Unionist

Newcomer of the Year (2011 only)
 Ruth Davidson MSP, Conservative and Unionist

Free Spirit/Maverick of the Year (2000-2008 only)
2008: Chris Harvie MSP, Scottish National Party
2007: Christine Grahame MSP, Scottish National Party
2006: Karen Gillon MSP, Labour
2005: Brian Monteith MSP, Independent
2004: Kenny MacAskill MSP, Scottish National Party
2003: John Farquhar Munro MSP, Liberal Democrats
2002: Elaine Smith MSP, Labour
2001: Donald Gorrie MSP, Liberal Democrats
2000: Margo MacDonald MSP, Scottish National Party

International Scot Award (2007 and 2008 only)
2008: Sir Sean Connery
2007: Sir Tom Hunter

Scottish Euro MP of the Year (2000-2003 only)
2003: Prof Sir Neil MacCormick MEP, Scottish National Party
2002: Prof Sir Neil MacCormick MEP, Scottish National Party
2001: David Martin MEP, Labour
2000: Prof Sir Neil MacCormick MEP, Scottish National Party

Election Performance of the Year (2003 only)
 Scottish Green Party

Front Bencher of the Year (1999 only)
 Susan Deacon MSP, Labour

Back Bencher of the Year (1999 only)
 Donald Gorrie MSP, Liberal Democrats

References

Sources

External links
 

1999 establishments in Scotland
Politics of Scotland
Politics awards
Scottish awards
Awards established in 1999
Politician of the Year
Awards by newspapers
The Herald (Glasgow)